The Buick Terraza is a luxury minivan that was marketed by Buick from 2005 through 2007 model years. The Terraza was a badge engineered variant of the Chevrolet, Pontiac, and Saturn minivans sharing the U platform; (Uplander, Montana SV6, and Relay respectively), all manufactured in Doraville, Georgia.

The Terraza retailed at US$28,110 in 2005 ($ in  dollars ). The Buick debuted with one engine, a 3.5 L High Value V6 that generates 200 hp (149 kW) and 220 lb·ft (298 N·m) of torque, going from 0-60 mph in the 9-second range. For 2006, a 3.9 L LZ9 V6, with 240 hp (179 kW) and 240 lb·ft (332 Nm) torque. It offered leather seats, and a wood trim on the panels and also offered on the steering wheel and gear shift knob.

For 2007, the 3.5 L V6 was dropped, leaving the 3.9 L as the base engine. Consequently, the optional AWD system was also dropped, since it could not handle the torque of the 3.9 L engine. A flex-fuel version of the 3.9 L V6 also became available for the Terraza's third season. The 2007 Terraza equipped with side airbags scored a "good" in the frontal offset and an "acceptable" in the side impact Insurance Institute for Highway Safety (IIHS) crash tests.

Year-by-year changes
2005 • Buick introduces the Terraza, its first minivan for the North-American market. The Terraza was available in two trim lines: entry-level CX (FWD or AWD) and top-of-the-line CXL (FWD or AWD).
2006 • The 3.5 L V6 could now be upgraded to a 3.9 (in FWD only) LZ9 V6 engine. Second row seat-mounted side airbags were now an option.
2007 • The Terraza's last year, and all-wheel drive models were dropped. For 2007, the 3.9 L V6 was the only engine offered, however it was available with a flex-fuel option. More standard features were offered on the new CX Plus model, which slotted between the CX and CXL. The Terraza was removed from Buick's website in early fall 2007.

Discontinuation
The Terraza was discontinued after the 2007 model year, the GM's Doraville plant closed on 26 September 2008, and the last Terraza was assembled in June 2007.

Sales

See also
Buick GL8 - A Chinese-exclusive minivan, whose first generation was based on the Terraza.

References

External links

All-wheel-drive vehicles
Front-wheel-drive vehicles
Minivans
Terraza
Cars introduced in 2005
Motor vehicles manufactured in the United States